Juan Arbós Perarnau (born November 12, 1952) is a former field hockey player from Spain. He won the silver medal with the Men's National Team at the 1980 Summer Olympics in Moscow.

References

External links
 
Spanish Olympic Committee

1952 births
Living people
Spanish male field hockey players
Field hockey players from Catalonia
Olympic field hockey players of Spain
Olympic silver medalists for Spain
Field hockey players at the 1972 Summer Olympics
Field hockey players at the 1976 Summer Olympics
Field hockey players at the 1980 Summer Olympics
Field hockey players at the 1984 Summer Olympics
Olympic medalists in field hockey
Medalists at the 1980 Summer Olympics
Atlètic Terrassa players
Sportspeople from Terrassa
20th-century Spanish people